East Flanders (Dutch: Oost-Vlaanderen ,) is a province of Belgium. It borders (clockwise from the North) the Dutch province of Zeeland and the Flemish province of Antwerp, Flemish Brabant, Hainaut and West Flanders. The capital is Ghent, home to the Ghent University and the Port of Ghent.

History 
During the short-lived Napoleonic Empire, most of the area of the modern province was part of the Department of Escaut, named after the River Scheldt. Following the defeat of Napoleon, the entity was renamed after its geographical location in the eastern part of the historic County of Flanders (now in the western portion of the current Flemish Region).

The provincial flag has a black lion with red tongue and claws, on a background of horizontal white and green stripes. This is a recent adaptation; formerly, East Flanders used the Flemish flag, a black lion on a yellow background, as in the current coat of arms. The old flag is still publicly used, e.g. for road signs.

Geography 
The province has several geographic or tourist regions:
 Denderstreek
 Meetjesland
 Waasland
 Flemish Ardennes

Important rivers are the Scheldt and the Leie which merge in Ghent. The Dender merges into the Scheldt in the city of Dendermonde.

Subdivisions 
East Flanders is divided into 6 administrative arrondissements (districts), subdivided into a total of 60 municipalities. In addition, there are 3 judicial and 3 electoral arrondissements.

Demographics 
The province has a population of almost 1.5 million. It had 734,000 inhabitants in 1830, when it was the most populated province of Belgium, and about a million in 1900. Population growth halted around the 1980s, but has increased again in the 21st century. Population figures in recent years is as follows:

The capital and biggest city is Ghent, also the second largest city in the Flemish Region. Other smaller cities are Aalst, Sint-Niklaas and Dendermonde in the east of the province. The eastern part of the province, part of the Flemish Diamond, is more densely populated than the western part.

Economy 
The Gross domestic product (GDP) of the province was 56.4 billion € in 2018. GDP per capita adjusted for purchasing power was 33,000 € or 109% of the EU27 average in the same year.

Government 

The provincial council (provincieraad) consists of 72 members which were last elected in the 2012 elections. Previously it consisted of 84 members. The council currently consists of the following political parties:
 N-VA (Flemish nationalists): 21 members
 CD&V (Christian democrats): 15 members
 Open VLD (liberals): 15 members
 sp.a (social democrats): 9 members
 Vlaams Belang (far-right nationalists): 6 members
 Groen (greens): 6 members

Six people chosen by and from the council form the daily government, called the deputation (deputatie). The deputation of East Flanders is a coalition of the political parties CD&V, Open Vld and sp.a. The biggest party in the council, N-VA, is not included.

The daily government is led by the governor, who is appointed by the Flemish Government. André Denys (VLD) has been the governor of East Flanders from 26 November 2004 until 21 January 2013. Jan Briers, who is not member of a political party but was nominated by N-VA, succeeded him on 1 February 2013.

The province has a yearly budget of approximately 300 million euro.

Governors 
 1830: Pierre De Ryckere
 1830–1834: Werner de Lamberts-Cortenbach
 1834–1836: Charles Vilain XIIII
 1837–1843: Louis de Schiervel
 1843–1848: Leander Desmaisières
 1848–1871: Edouard De Jaegher (lib.)
 1871–1879: Emile de T'Serclaes De Wommersom
 1879–1885: Léon Verhaeghe de Naeyer (lib.)
 1885–1919: Raymond de Kerchove d'Exaerde
 1919–1921: Maurice Lippens (lib.)
 1921–1929: André de Kerchove de Denterghem (lib.)
 1929–1935: Karel Weyler (lib.)
 1935–1938: Jules Ingenbleek (lib.)
 1938–1939: Louis Frederiq (lib)
 1939–1954: Maurice Van den Boogaerde
 1954–1963: Albert Mariën (lib.)
 1963–1984: Roger de Kinder (BSP)
 1984–2004: Herman Balthazar (SP.A)
 2004-2013: André Denys (VLD)
 2013-2018: Jan Briers (none; nominated by N-VA)
 2018–present: Carina Van Cauter (VLD)

Timeline:

References

External links 

  Official Website

 
NUTS 2 statistical regions of the European Union
Provinces of Flanders